Rubén Rangel (born August 12, 1977 in Monagas) is a male professional racing cyclist from Venezuela.

Career

1999
6th in general classification Vuelta a Venezuela (VEN)
2nd in general classification under 23 (1999 Vuelta a Venezuela) (VEN)
2002
1st in Stage 2 Vuelta a Venezuela, Santa Barbara de Taprin (VEN)

External links

1977 births
Living people
People from Monagas
Venezuelan male cyclists
Vuelta a Venezuela stage winners
20th-century Venezuelan people